The Gârliște mine is a large open pit mine in the western part of Romania in Goruia, Caraș-Severin County. Gârliște represents one of the largest iron ore reserves in Romania, having estimated reserves of 3.6 million tonnes of ore.

References 

Iron mines in Romania